Gugheorites is a genus of beetle in the family Carabidae. The only species in the genus is Gugheorites scotti.

References

Harpalinae
Monotypic Carabidae genera